Ger Harings (born 25 May 1948) is a Dutch racing cyclist. He rode in the 1971 Tour de France.

References

1948 births
Living people
Dutch male cyclists
Place of birth missing (living people)
20th-century Dutch people